Phycita torrenti is a species of snout moth. It is found in Spain and Portugal.

The larvae feed on Quercus ilex.

References

Moths described in 1962
Phycitini